Mouhoubé Alex Somian (born 6 June 1986 in Abidjan) is an Ivorian footballer who plays for Kazma in Kuwaiti Premier League.

Club career
Somian played for Jeunesse Club d'Abidjan and Stella Club d'Adjamé in the Ivory Coast Premier Soccer League, before being bought by ES Setif of Algeria in 2007. Somian showed good performances in his first year in the Algerian League and was quickly bought by CR Belouizdad from ES Setif. Somian was named the most valuable player in Algerian League in 2008.

On January 2, Somian signed for Kuwaiti Premier League side Kazma.

He currently plays for Stade Tunisien in the Tunisian Ligue 1.

References

1986 births
Living people
Ivorian footballers
Ivorian expatriate footballers
Expatriate footballers in Algeria
ES Sétif players
CR Belouizdad players
JC d'Abidjan players
Ivorian expatriate sportspeople in Algeria
Stella Club d'Adjamé players
FC Shinnik Yaroslavl players
Expatriate footballers in Russia
Footballers from Abidjan
Association football midfielders